Pauker or Paucker is a surname of German origin. It may refer to:

Alexander Paucker (1905–1972), Romanian composer
Ana Pauker (1893–1960), Romanian politician
Karl Pauker (1893–1937), Russian bodyguard
K. V. Pauker (born 1944), Swedish writer  
Magnus Georg Paucker (1787–1855), German astronomer and mathematician
Marcel Pauker (1896–1938), Romanian politician

See also
Simmering-Graz-Pauker, an Austrian manufacturer

Jewish surnames
Yiddish-language surnames